Žilinėliai is a village in Jakėnai Eldership, Varėna District Municipality, Alytus County, in southeastern Lithuania. As of the 2011 census, the population was 20.

Geography 
The village is located in southeastern Lithuania, in the northern part of Varėna District Municipality.

Demographics 
As of the census of 2011, there were 20 people, of which 45% were male and 55% female.

As of the census of 2001, there were 37 people, of which 48.6% were male and 51.4% female.

Transportation 
National road  (Naujieji Valkininkai–Daugai–Alytus) also runs north of the village.

References 

Villages in Varėna District Municipality